Godfrey William Mgimwa (born 24 August 1981) is a Tanzanian CCM politician.

Early life and career
Mgimwa was born in Iringa Region. He is the son of former Tanzanian Finance Minister William Mgimwa. He was educated at Wilolesi Primary, Azania Secondary and St Mary's High School. In 2014, he won the Kalenga by-election by a landslide receiving 22,962 votes (79.27%).

References

1981 births
Living people
Chama Cha Mapinduzi MPs
Tanzanian MPs 2010–2015
Tanzanian MPs 2015–2020
Azania Secondary School alumni
Alumni of London Metropolitan University